Greenwood High School is a public, co-educational 9-12 secondary school in the Greenwood area, in unincorporated Midland County, Texas, with a Midland postal address. It is a part of the Greenwood Independent School District. (This is not the same school as the defunct Greenwood High School in Wise County, Texas where NAIA scoring champion and #1 NBA draft pick Clifton McNeely attended in the 1930's.)

Demographics
The demographic breakdown of the 527 students enrolled in 2013-14 was:
Male - 55.8%
Female - 44.2%
Native American/Alaskan - 0.2%
Asian/Pacific islanders - 0.2%
Black - 1.3%
Hispanic - 37.4%
White - 59.4%
Multiracial - 1.5%

21.6% of the students were eligible for free or reduced lunch.

Athletics 
Greenwood High School fields teams in football, baseball, basketball, volleyball, cross country, tennis, golf, softball, powerlifting, and track and field . They compete in UIL district 4A.

Mascot
The mascot for Greenwood High is the Ranger man. He is commonly seen with 2 revolvers and a cowboy hat. Recently, a female counterpart has been with the Ranger man named the Rangerette.

Welding
GISD has had a very impressive welding team for quite a long time. The leader of the team is the welding instructure, Terryel Gloden.

References

External links 
 Greenwood High School

Public high schools in Texas
Schools in Midland County, Texas